"Sorti de L'enfer" is the debut single by Danish dance-pop duo Infernal (at the time a trio). It was released as the lead single from their debut album, Infernal Affairs, in 1997.

The song originates from live performances at the nightclub Diskotek IN (http://www.discotekin.dk) in Copenhagen. Søren Haahr, then working as a DJ, hired an act called Bordeaux, which consisted of Paw Lagermann, Lina Rafn, Kristian Paulsen and Nicolai Villum Jensen, to perform on stage. They performed what would later be known as "Sorti de L'enfer" at a Scottish-themed event. The song, which featured bagpipes, became so popular that it was eventually released on Kenneth Bager's FLEX Records. Shortly before the release Paulsen and Villum Jensen decided to leave – and instead Søren Haahr joined Paw and Lina – thus giving birth to Infernal, named after the nightclub, Diskotek IN.

Track listing

Credits and personnel
Written, produced, arranged and mixed by Infernal and Kristian Paulsen
Lyrics by Paw Lagermann and Lina Rafn

Charts

References

External links
Kalinka at Discogs

1997 debut singles
Infernal (Danish band) songs
Songs written by Paw Lagermann
Songs written by Lina Rafn
1997 songs